Dispute resolution or dispute settlement is the process of resolving disputes between parties. The term dispute resolution is sometimes used interchangeably with conflict resolution. 

Prominent venues for dispute settlement in international law include the International Court of Justice (formerly the Permanent Court of International Justice); the United Nations Human Rights Committee (which operates under the ICCPR) and European Court of Human Rights; the Panels and Appellate Body of the World Trade Organization; and the International Tribunal for the Law of the Sea. Half of all international agreements include a dispute settlement mechanism.

States are also known to establish their own arbitration tribunals to settle disputes. Prominent private international courts, which adjudicate disputes between commercial private entities, include the International Court of Arbitration (of the International Chamber of Commerce) and the London Court of International Arbitration.

Methods
Methods of dispute resolution include:
 lawsuits (litigation) (legislative) 
 arbitration
 collaborative law
 mediation
 conciliation
 negotiation
 facilitation
avoidance

One could theoretically include violence or even war as part of this spectrum, but dispute resolution practitioners do not usually do so; violence rarely ends disputes effectively, and indeed, often only escalates them. Also, violence rarely causes the parties involved in the dispute to no longer disagree on the issue that caused the violence. For example, a country successfully winning a war to annex part of another country's territory doesn't cause the former waring nations to no longer seriously disagree to whom the territory rightly belongs to and tensions may still remain high between the two nations. 

Dispute resolution processes fall into two major types:
 Adjudicative processes, such as litigation or arbitration, in which a judge, jury or arbitrator determines the outcome.
 Consensual processes, such as collaborative law, mediation, conciliation, or negotiation, in which the parties attempt to reach agreement.

Not all disputes, even those in which skilled intervention occurs, end in resolution. Such intractable disputes form a special area in dispute resolution studies.

Dispute resolution is an important requirement in international trade, including negotiation, mediation, arbitration and litigation.

Legal dispute resolution
The legal system provides resolutions for many different types of disputes. Some disputants will not reach agreement through a collaborative process. Some disputes need the coercive power of the state to enforce a resolution. Perhaps more importantly, many people want a professional advocate when they become involved in a dispute, particularly if the dispute involves perceived legal rights, legal wrongdoing, or threat of legal action against them.

The most common form of judicial dispute resolution is litigation. Litigation is initiated when one party files suit against another. In the United States, litigation is facilitated by the government within federal, state, and municipal courts. While litigation is often used to resolve disputes, it's strictly speaking a form of conflict adjudication and not a form of conflict resolution per se. This is because litigation only determines the legal rights and obligations of parties involved in a dispute and doesn't necessarily solve the disagreement between the parties involved in the dispute. For example, supreme court cases can rule on whether US states have the constitutional right to criminalize abortion but won't cause the parties involved in the case to no longer disagree on whether states do indeed have the constitutional authority to restrict access to abortion as one of the parties may disagree with the supreme courts reasoning and still disagree with the party that the supreme court sided with. Litigation proceedings are very formal and are governed by rules, such as rules of evidence and procedure, which are established by the legislature. Outcomes are decided by an impartial judge and/or jury, based on the factual questions of the case and the application law. The verdict of the court is binding, not advisory; however, both parties have the right to appeal the judgment to a higher court. Judicial dispute resolution is typically adversarial in nature, for example, involving antagonistic parties or opposing interests seeking an outcome most favorable to their position. 

Due to the antagonistic nature of litigation, collaborators frequently opt for solving disputes privately. 

Retired judges or private lawyers often become arbitrators or mediators; however, trained and qualified non-legal dispute resolution specialists form a growing body within the field of alternative dispute resolution (ADR). In the United States, many states now have mediation or other ADR programs annexed to the courts, to facilitate settlement of lawsuits.

Extrajudicial dispute resolution
Some use the term dispute resolution to refer only to alternative dispute resolution (ADR), that is, extrajudicial processes such as arbitration, collaborative law, and mediation used to resolve conflict and potential conflict between and among individuals, business entities, governmental agencies, and (in the public international law context) states. ADR generally depends on agreement by the parties to use ADR processes, either before or after a dispute has arisen. ADR has experienced steadily increasing acceptance and utilization because of a perception of greater flexibility, costs below those of traditional litigation, and speedy resolution of disputes, among other perceived advantages. However, some have criticized these methods as taking away the right to seek redress of grievances in the courts, suggesting that extrajudicial dispute resolution may not offer the fairest way for parties not in an equal bargaining relationship, for example in a dispute between a consumer and a large corporation. In addition, in some circumstances, arbitration and other ADR processes may become as expensive as litigation or more so.

See also

 Collaborative divorce
 Conflict resolution research
 Diplomacy
 Dispute pyramid
 Investor-state dispute settlement
 National Arbitration Forum
 Party-directed mediation
 Peacekeeping
 Restorative justice
 UN Peacemaker

References

Further reading
 Sherwyn, David, Tracey, Bruce & Zev Eigen, "In Defense of Mandatory Arbitration of Employment Disputes: Saving the Baby, Tossing out the Bath Water, and Constructing a New Sink in the Process", 2 U. Pa. J. Lab. & Emp. L. 73 (1999)
 Ury, William, 2000. The Third Side: Why We Fight and How We Can Stop. New York: Penguin Putnam. 
Alés, Javier y Mata, Juan Diego " manual práctico para mediadores: el misterio de la mediacion" éxito Atelier. Barcelona 2016

 
Interpersonal conflict